Aleinu (Hebrew: , lit. "upon us", meaning "[it is] our duty") or Aleinu leshabei'ach (Hebrew: "[it is] our duty to praise [God]"), meaning "it is upon us" or "it is our obligation or duty" to "praise God," is a Jewish prayer found in the siddur, the classical Jewish prayerbook. It is recited in most communities at the end of each of the three daily Jewish services and in the middle of the Rosh Hashanah mussaf. It is also recited in many communities following Kiddush levana and after a circumcision is performed. It is second only to the Kaddish (counting all its forms) as the most frequently recited prayer in current synagogue liturgy.

History
A folkloric tradition attributes this prayer to the biblical Joshua at the time of his conquest of Jericho. This might have been inspired by the fact that the first letters of the first four verses spell, in reverse, Hoshea, which was the childhood name of Joshua (Numbers 13:16). Another attribution is to the Men of the Great Assembly, during the Second Temple period. An early—that is, pre-Christian—origin of the prayer is evidenced by its explicit mention of bowing and kneeling—practices associated with the Temple, and its non-mention of exile or a desire to restore Israel or the Temple. On the other hand, it has been argued that the phrase: lirot meherah be-tiferet uzechah (to speedily see your tiferet and oz) is in fact a request for the speedy rebuilding of the Temple. The allusion is based on Psalms 78:61 and 96:6. If so, at least the second paragraph of Aleinu was written after the destruction in 70 CE (perhaps around the time of Abba Arikha).

Its first appearance is the manuscript of the Rosh Hashana liturgy by the Babylonian Talmudic sage Abba Arika. He included it in the Rosh Hashana mussaf service as a prologue to the Kingship portion of the Amidah. For that reason some attribute to Arika the authorship, or at least the revising, of Aleinu.

In Blois, France, in 1171, it is alleged that a number of Jews—reportedly 34 men and 17 women—were burned at the stake for refusing to renounce their faith. They are said to have gone to their deaths bravely singing Aleinu to a "soul-stirring" melody, which astonished their executioners. Some have suggested that this act of martyrdom inspired the adoption of Aleinu into the daily liturgy. But Aleinu is already found at the end of the daily shacharit in Machzor Vitry in the early 12th century, well before 1171.

Text
The following is the first half of the current Ashkenazi version of the prayer (there is also a second paragraph, which some traditions omit, though it is a standard part of the Ashkenazi orthodox liturgy).

The literal translation of line number 9 is "But we bend our knees and bow down and express thanks". The Sefardic/Mizrahi tradition shortens this line to ואנחנוּ משׁתּחום—Va'anchnu mishtachavim—"But we bow down". The quotation in lines 18–21 is Deuteronomy 4:39.

Use in the synagogue
Aleinu is recited with all the congregants standing. One reason for this is noble sentiments are expressed, but also that the first and last letters of the prayer spell עד—"witness"—and it is appropriate for a witness to stand when testifying.

The original context of this prayer was as part of the middle paragraphs of the Amidah prayer in the mussaf (additional) service on Rosh Hashanah (Jewish New Year), and more specifically in the passage known as Malchuyot (the kingdom of God). In this context it includes both paragraphs of the prayer. The first paragraph is also included at the equivalent point in the liturgy for Yom Kippur.

In the Middle Ages varying customs emerged of reciting the first paragraph every day, at the end of either the morning service alone or of all the prayer services for the day. In the 16th century the kabbalist Hayim Vital, recording the opinions of Isaac Luria, ruled that both paragraphs should be included in all services, and should end with the verse "on that day the Lord shall be one and His Name one". This has been accepted in almost all communities except for the Spanish and Portuguese Jews, who retain the "short Alenu". The custom according to some North African prayer books is to recite the second paragraph only at the conclusion of weekday morning services.

In some Ashkenazic communities, Aleinu is not recited at Mincha when it is followed immediately by Maariv, as this is not considered the end of the service.  Furthermore, in the Italian and Yemenite rites, Aleinu is never recited in Mincha.

In the daily and Sabbath services, when the line (numbered, above, as line 9, here translated literally) "But we bend our knees and bow" is recited, many have the custom to flex their knees and then bend from the waist, straightening up by the time the words "before (lif'nei) the King of kings of kings" are reached. But on the High Holy Days of Rosh Hashana and Yom Kippur, the worshipper will not merely flex and bend, but will actually get down on his knees at those words, and many congregants will prostrate themselves on the floor (in those synagogues with sufficient floor space).

In Orthodox and Conservative congregations, the Torah Ark remains closed while it is recited (except on Rosh Hashana and Yom Kippur, when the Ark is opened), but in some Reform congregations the Ark is opened whenever Aleinu is recited. In Sefardic congregations, as well as in the Askenazic traditions of Frankfurt and Mainz, Aleinu is not followed by the Mourner's Kaddish (because, variously, Aleinu was whispered to avoid antagonizing the Christian authorities, or because Aleinu is not a reading from Scripture), elsewhere it is.

Censored passage
Referring the lines above numbered 7 & 8:

The earlier form of this prayer contains an additional sentence:

This sentence is built from two quotations from the Bible, specifically from the Book of Isaiah, Isaiah 30:7, "For the help of Egypt shall be (הבל וריק) vain and empty ..."; and Isaiah 45:20. "... No foreknowledge had they who carry their wooden images (וּמתפּללים אל־אל לא יוֹשׁיע) and pray to a God who cannot give success." (New JPS) The line is still set out in full in Sephardi and Italian prayer books, but was omitted in most of the older printed Ashkenazi prayer books. In some older editions of other rites (e.g., the Maḥzor Aram Soba, 1560, as well as some editions of the Ashkenazic prayer book) a blank line was left in the printing, leaving it free for the missing line to be filled in handwriting. In many current Orthodox Jewish siddurim (prayer books) this line has been restored, and the practice of reciting it has increased.

Although the above text, which includes the censored verse, is taken from the 2009 Koren Sacks Siddur, edited by Rabbi Jonathan Sacks (in that edition the censored verse is printed without any distinguishing marks), the 2007 4th edition of The Authorised Daily Prayer Book of the United Hebrew Congregations of the Commonwealth, edited by the same Rabbi Sacks, omits the censored verse completely and without any indication that such a verse ever existed.

History of the censorship
Approximately a century after this prayer was incorporated into the daily liturgy, circa 1300, an apostate Jew, known as Pesach Peter, denounced it as a secret anti-Christian slur on the grounds that the word וריק—varik, "and emptiness"—had, in gematria (Hebrew numerology) the value of 316, the same as ישׁו—Jesus. In vain did the rabbis defend the sentence on the grounds that the expression came from the Book of Isaiah, or that the whole prayer came from Joshua, and therefore must predate Christianity, or, if the prayer was attributed to Rav, living in 3rd-century Babylonia (Persia), that he never encountered a Christian.—It probably did not help that at roughly the same time a rabbinic commentary on the prayers, Arugat haBosem by Abraham ben Azriel, made the point that, in gematria, "vanity and emptiness" had the same value as ישׁו ומחמט—"Jesus and Mohammed". As a result of this, in various places the Christian authorities censored the sentence, usually omitting it.

Circa 1938, Herbert Lowe, the Reader in Rabbinics at Cambridge University, wrote: "No Jew who recites it ever thinks of it in relation to Christians: the chief thought in his mind is the noble conclusion. It is, in fact, a universalist pronouncement of the Messianic hope, and with this idea every service concludes."

As a result of this censorship, a curious practice arose - it may have predated the censorship, but thereafter acquired encouragement as a form of resistance - that where the word "emptiness" occurred - or should have occurred - the individual was supposed to spit (on the floor), on the pretext that "emptiness" is very similar to the Hebrew word for "spittle". This practice was mentioned by the early 15th century. When, for example, the accusations about this verse were revived in Prussia in 1703, the government (in Berlin) enacted that the controversial verse should be omitted altogether and that spitting or recoiling was forbidden and that the prayer would be recited aloud "in unison" by the whole congregation (to make sure nobody was surreptitiously reciting the verse) and that government inspectors would be posted in synagogues to ensure compliance. Apparently no one was ever prosecuted for violating this edict. In some other places, the practice of spitting persisted (or at least was remembered), and there arose a Yiddish expression for someone arriving very late for services (perhaps just to recite the Mourners' Kaddish, which follows Aleinu), "He arrives at the spitting".

In the daily synagogue services, the Torah Ark is closed while Aleinu is recited, but on Rosh Hashana, when Aleinu is recited during the Mussaf Amidah, the Ark is opened when Aleinu is begun, closed momentarily when the controversial verse was recited (presumably to shield the Torah scrolls from hearing a description of heathen practices) and then opened again as soon as that verse was finished, and then closed again when Aleinu is finished. Even after the controversial verse was deleted from the liturgy, owing to Christian censorship, the Ark was momentarily closed although nothing was recited at that moment, as a relic and reminder of the censored verse.

Conservative Rabbi Reuven Hammer comments on the excised sentence:

Originally the text read that God has not made us like the nations who "bow down to nothingness and vanity, and pray to an impotent god." ... In the Middle Ages these words were censored, since the church believed they were an insult to Christianity. Omitting them tends to give the impression that the Aleinu teaches that we are both different and better than others. The actual intent is to say that we are thankful that God has enlightened us so that, unlike the pagans, we worship the true God and not idols. There is no inherent superiority in being Jewish, but we do assert the superiority of monotheistic belief over paganism. Although paganism still exists today, we are no longer the only ones to have a belief in one God.

In 1656, Manasseh ben Israel reported that the Sultan Selim (presumably Selim II, 1524–74), having read the uncensored text of Aleinu in Turkish translation, declared: "Truly this prayer is sufficient for all purposes. There is no need of any other."

Restoration
Some Orthodox rabbinical authorities, prominently the 19th-century Rabbi Moshe Yehoshua Leib Diskin (Maharil Diskin, died 1898), have argued that the disputed phrase should be recited in communities that previously omitted it.

Other variations
In several communities, changes have been introduced, especially in the opening lines of the text, to make it less controversial and extreme in its appearance of  ethnocentrism. In some instances these changes have taken the form of less-than-literal translations of the traditional Hebrew into the local language.

There was, evidently, an experimental amendment to the preceding verse in one or more Sephardic prayerbooks: "... He has not made us like some nations of other countries ..." But this amendment was abandoned. The past tense formulation ("worshipped" and "bowed down") appears in the translation in the London Sephardic prayer books, though the Hebrew retains the present tense.

More far-reaching changes have been made to the wording of this prayer in Conservative and Reform prayer books. For example, the British Reform version borrows words from the blessings over the Torah, and begins "It is our duty to praise the Ruler of all, to recognise the greatness of the Creator of first things, who has chosen us from all peoples by giving us Torah. Therefore we bend low and submit." Reconstructionist Judaism changes the lines which refer to the chosen people to read, "who gave us teachings of truth and implanted eternal life within us." The opening of Aleinu is frequent site for liturgical creativity for authors of all stripes.

Although the second paragraph of the standard text of Aleinu today includes the phrase "le-taqen olam" לתקן עולם (to fix the world), some scholars suggest that the original text had "le-taken olam" לתכן עולם (spelled with a kaf, not a quf). One can see the "kaf" reading in the text of Siddur Rav Saadiah Gaon, in the Yemenite ritual, and in fragments from the Cairo Genizah. While the verb t-q-n can mean to fix, repair, prepare, or establish, the meaning of t-k-n would more strictly mean to establish, yielding the interpretation "to establish a world under the kingdom of God." In either case, Aleinu originally would have meant to establish God's sovereignty over the whole world.

See also
 List of Jewish prayers and blessings
 Jewish services

References

External links
 Audio file Aleinu (first part); MP3
 Audio file Aleinu (second part); MP3

Shacharit
Mincha
Maariv
Hebrew words and phrases in Jewish prayers and blessings
Jewish prayer and ritual texts